Qaleh Now (also Romanized as Qal`eh Now) is a village in Ahmadi Rural District, Ahmadi District, Hajjiabad County, Hormozgan Province, Iran. At the 2006 census, its population was 29, in 11 families.

References 

Populated places in Hajjiabad County